Encs is a district in northern part of Borsod-Abaúj-Zemplén County. Encs is also the name of the town where the district seat is found. The district is located in the Northern Hungary Statistical Region.

Geography 
Encs District borders with the Slovakian region of Košice to the north, Gönc District to the east and south, Szikszó District and Edelény District to the south and west. The number of the inhabited places in Encs District is 29.

Municipalities 
The district has 1 town and 28 villages.
(ordered by population, as of 1 January 2012)

The bolded municipality is the city.

Demographics

In 2011, it had a population of 21,390 and the population density was 56/km².

Ethnicity
Besides the Hungarian majority, the main minority is the Roma (approx. 5,000).

Total population (2011 census): 21,390
Ethnic groups (2011 census): Identified themselves: 25,108 persons:
Hungarians: 19,862 (79.11%)
Gypsies: 4,973 (19.81%)
Others and indefinable: 273 (1.09%)
Approx. 4,000 persons in Encs District did declare more than one ethnic group at the 2011 census.

Religion
Religious adherence in the county according to 2011 census:

Catholic – 13,537 (Roman Catholic – 11,519; Greek Catholic – 2,013);
Reformed – 3,371;
Evangelical – 277;
other religions – 172; 
Non-religious – 868; 
Atheism – 41;
Undeclared – 3,124.

Gallery

See also
List of cities and towns of Hungary

References

External links
 Postal codes of the Encs District

Districts in Borsod-Abaúj-Zemplén County